Sisay Bancha (24 August 1989) is an Ethiopian professional football player who currently plays for the Ethiopian Premier League team Dedebit and  the number one goalkeeper of the current Ethiopian national football team.

Career

The 5'11" goalkeeper left Sidama Coffee for Dedebit in July 2012 after establishing himself as one of the best goalkeepers in the Ethiopian Premier League. Sisay looks to have a promising career ahead of him for club and country. In 2008, he was awarded with the best Ethiopian goalkeeper of the year award.

International career

Sisay debuted for Ethiopia in 2012, and so far has collected 6 caps, being sent off in two of them.

References

External links 
 
 
 

1989 births
Association football goalkeepers
Ethiopian footballers
Ethiopia international footballers
Living people
2013 Africa Cup of Nations players
Sportspeople from Southern Nations, Nationalities, and Peoples' Region